The 1984–85 Sussex County Football League season was the 60th in the history of Sussex County Football League a football competition in England.

Division One

Division One featured 14 clubs which competed in the division last season, along with two new clubs, promoted from Division Two:
Arundel
Portfield

League table

Division Two

Division Two featured 13 clubs which competed in the division last season, along with three new clubs:
Ferring, promoted from Division Three
Franklands Village, promoted from Division Three
Pagham, relegated from Division One

League table

Division Three

Division Three featured ten clubs which competed in the division last season, along with five new clubs:
Cooksbridge
Crowborough Athletic, relegated from Division Two
Ifield
Oakwood, joined from the Southern Counties Combination League
Saltdean United

League table

References

1984-85
1984–85 in English football leagues